Chrysothamnus eremobius, the Pintwater rabbitbrush , is a rare North American species of flowering plants in the tribe Astereae within the family Asteraceae. It has been found only in the Pintwater and Sheep Ranges of Clark and Lincoln Counties in southern Nevada.

Chrysothamnus eremobius is a branching shrub up to 30 cm (12 inches) tall. It produces large, dense arrays of small yellow flower heads, each with disc florets but no ray florets. It grows in the crevices of limestone cliffs.

References

External links
photo of herbarium specimen at Missouri Botanical Garden, collected in Clark County, Nevada, isotype of Chrysothamnus eremobius

Astereae
Flora of Nevada
Endemic flora of the United States
Clark County, Nevada
Lincoln County, Nevada
Plants described in 1983